The yellow-lored bristlebill or lesser bristlebill (Bleda notatus) is a species of songbird in the bulbul family, Pycnonotidae. It is found in central Africa.

Taxonomy and systematics
The yellow-lored bristlebill was originally described in the genus Trichophorus (a synonym for Criniger). Formerly, some authorities considered the yellow-lored bristlebill as conspecific with the green-tailed bristlebill.

References

 Sinclair, Ian & Ryan, Peter (2003) Birds of Africa south of the Sahara, Struik, Cape Town.

Further reading

yellow-lored bristlebill
Birds of the Gulf of Guinea
Birds of Central Africa
yellow-lored bristlebill
Taxonomy articles created by Polbot